Night Raiders is a 1952 American Western film directed by Howard Bretherton with a screenplay by Maurice Tombragel. The film was written as a star vehicle for Whip Wilson, who portrayed himself in the film. The plot of the film involves Whip saving a town from a corrupt Sheriff and his goons. The film also stars Fuzzy Knight as Tex, Lois Hall as Laura Davis, Tommy Farrell as Jim Dugan, Terry Frost as Mike Lorch, Lane Bradford as Henchman Talbot, and Marshall Reed as Sheriff Ernie Hodkins.

External links

1952 films
1952 Western (genre) films
American Western (genre) films
American black-and-white films
Monogram Pictures films
1950s American films